Paramanu is a technical term in Buddhism, Hinduism and Jainism. It is defined as the smallest and indivisible particle of matter. In Hindi language paramanu refers to the atom.

In Jainism it is one of the two types of Pudgala (matter), the other being Skandha. It also helps to define smallest measure of space. All the Parmanus occupy exactly same amount of space. The measure of the space occupied by one Parmanu is called Pradesha.

Other uses
Parmanu: The Story of Pokhran

References

Atomism
Jain philosophical concepts
Religious cosmologies